Pokrovka is a rural locality (a village) in Naumovsky Selsoviet, Sterlitamaksky District, Bashkortostan, Russia. The population was 562 as of 2010.

Geography 
It is located 10 km from Sterlitamak, 3 km from Naumovka.

References 

Rural localities in Sterlitamaksky District